BVK can refer to:
BVK - Bundesverband Kamera - German Society of Cinematographers
Huacaraje Airport (IATA: BVK), Huacaraje, Bolivia
Buckland Airport (FAA LID: BVK), Buckland, Alaska, United States